"Costa Rica" is a song by Swedish singer Benjamin Ingrosso. It was released as a single on 12 July 2019 by TEN Music Group. The song peaked at number 17 on the Swedish Singles Chart.

Background
It's about Ingrosso ending his relationship with Linnea Wildmark. Talking about the song, Ingrosso said, "This song is incredibly personal to me. It's about that stage after a break up where you feel bitter about what happened and you haven’t really let the person go. If you listen carefully to the lyrics – you know exactly what the song is about."

Track listing

Charts

Certifications

References

2019 songs
2019 singles
Benjamin Ingrosso songs
English-language Swedish songs
Songs written by Benjamin Ingrosso